The Bahamas national baseball team represents the Bahamas in international baseball competitions. The team is administered by the Bahamas Baseball Association (BBA).

The team was in the 2009 World Baseball Challenge, but went 0-6. They were managed by Jeffrey Francis.

References

National baseball teams
Baseball